The 1990 Mid-Continent Conference Tournament took place from May 11 through 14. The top 4 regular season finishers of the league's eight teams met in the double-elimination tournament held in Chicago, Illinois.  won the tournament for the first time.

Format and seeding
The top two teams from each division advanced to the tournament.  The top seed from each division played the second seed from the opposite division in the second round.

Tournament

All-Tournament Team

Tournament Most Valuable Player
Kevin Walker of UIC was named Tournament MVP.

References

Tournament
Summit League Baseball Tournament
Mid-Continent Conference baseball tournament
Mid-Continent Conference baseball tournament